The Bishop of Gibraltar may refer to the ordinary of the Roman Catholic or Anglican Diocese of Gibraltar:

 Roman Catholic Bishop of Gibraltar
 Bishop in Europe, (Anglican Bishop of Gibraltar) in Europe

Bishops of Gibraltar